Toromoja is a village in Central District of Botswana. The village is located close to Makgadikgadi Pan, in the western part of the district, and it has a primary school. The population was 649 in 2001 census.

References

Populated places in Central District (Botswana)
Villages in Botswana